The Indian locomotive class YDM-3 is a class of diesel-electric locomotive that was developed in 1964 by GM-EMD for Indian Railways. The model name stands for Metre gauge (Y), Diesel (D), Mixed traffic (M) engine, 3rd generation (3). They entered service in 1962. A total of 30 YDM-3 locomotives was built between 1961 and 1962.

The YDM-3 served both passenger and freight trains for over 35 years. As of January 2020, all 30 locomotives have been withdrawn from service with two locomotives being preserved.

History 
The history of YDM-3 begins in the early 1960s with the stated aim of the Indian Railways to remove steam locomotives from Indian rails after recommendation of Karnail Singh Fuel Committee. Therefore, required building a large number of Meter gauge diesel locomotives. Thus Indian Railways began looking at various diesel-electric designs. EMD gave them the model number GA12

Meter gauge, though rare gauge today, used to be a dominant gauge that time. After the introduction of YDM-1 locomotives by North British, Indian Railway thought for more powerful ones and hence EMD and the American Locomotive Company (ALCO) submitted designs of YDM-3/YDM-5 (12-567C) and YDM-4 respectively for new diesel locomotives. Each company supplied their locomotives in 1961. So about twenty five of these YDM-5 locomotives were ordered from General Motors, USA in the year 1963–64. While YDM-3 was 13 ton lighter than the YDM-4, Indian Railways opted for the ALCO design.

The YDM-4 was considered over the YDM-3 model because of these reasons.

 EMD would not consider transfer of technology at the time while ALCO accepted. This allowed YDM-4 locomotives to be manufactured in India.
 The EMD locomotives were able to generate only half as much continuous tractive effort than their ALCO counterpart.
 The ALCO YDM-4 had the more heavier axle load.
 YDM-4 cab provided better view in long hood forward operation over the YDM-3 models which had cab at one end.
 Maximum speed on YDM-5 locomotives was only 80kmph compared to 100kmph for YDM-4.
 YDM-4 with its simpler electrics were easier to maintain.

These locomotives are designed for mixed traffic operation. The initial fleet of YDM-3 locomotives were allocated and homed at the diesel locomotive shed in Siliguri and were tested extensively on the Northeast Frontier Railway zone (NFR). Then the entire YDM-3 fleet was transferred to Sabarmati sometime after 1963. Sabarmati serving the present day Western Railway zone. They hauled passenger trains like Girnar Express, Pink City express, Ashram express. The YDM-3 locomotives had an unusual arrangement for the traction motors. These were mounted longitudinally on the mainframe and drove the wheel-sets through cardan shafts. This required a lot of maintenance, possibly more than the axle-hung motors of the YDM-4 types. But In cab-forward mode, the YDM-3 locomotives offered an excellent view, and the cabin was more spacious than the YDM-4.

By the late 1990s the locomotives were had been withdrawn from service, all because of spare parts becoming difficult to source and work for the class declining due to conversion of meter gauge to broad gauge. These locomotives were withdrawn as life-expired in February 1996, and the remainder of the batch that had not recently been overhauled followed in the next two years. All 30 were withdrawn.

Preserved Locomotives 
Out of the 25 units built, only one locomotive has been preserved in front of BLW GM office.

Former sheds 

 Silliguri (SGUJ)
 Sabarmati (SBI)
  All the locomotives of this class has been withdrawn from service.

Technical specifications

See also 

 IIndian locomotive class YDM-5
 Indian locomotive class WDM-4
 Locomotives of India
 Rail transport in India#History

References

External links
 YDM-4 Diesel Locomotive Internals

Electro-Motive Division locomotives
M, Y-3
1-B-B-1 locomotives
Railway locomotives introduced in 1961
Metre gauge locomotives